Guillaume Couillard (born 10 December 1975) is a professional Monegasque former tennis player. Couillard reached his career-high ATP Tour singles ranking of World No. 569 in October 2002. He primarily played on the Futures circuit and the Challenger circuit.
He is currently coaching Monegasque  Hugo Nys.

Tennis career 

Couillard was a member of the Monegasque Davis Cup team since 2002, having posted a 14–10 record in singles and a 13–10 record in doubles in thirty-five ties played.

In 2013, Couillard and Benjamin Balleret played the longest professional tiebreak in known tennis history, lasting 70 points (34–36). Couillard lost the match 6–7(34), 1–6 in the third qualifying round for the USA F1 Futures in Plantation, Florida.

Career finals

Singles (0–2)

References

External links
 
 
 

1975 births
Monegasque male tennis players
Living people